Total Euphoria is the first and only studio album by the Australian dance trio Euphoria. The album was released in October 1992 by EMI Australia and peaked at number 14 on the Australian Album Charts.  The album featured four singles, two of which reached number one on the Australian Singles Chart: "Love You Right" in February 1992 and "One In a Million" in June 1992. The album was co-produced and co-written by Andrew Klippel and Ean Sugarman.

Track listing

Charts

References

1992 debut albums
Euphoria (Australian band) albums
EMI Records albums